Something Wicked is the fifth studio album by American thrash metal band Nuclear Assault, released on February 23, 1993 by I.R.S. Records.

This is the first and only album not to feature founding members Dan Lilker and Anthony Bramante, as they departed in 1992 before the recording process began. Their replacements, Scott Metaxas and Dave DiPietro, were both part of the final Prophet line-up that recorded the Recycled album; DiPietro had also previously played in T.T. Quick with drummer Glenn Evans. Something Wicked would also be Nuclear Assault's final studio album for 12 years, until the release of Third World Genocide in 2005.

The record is considered a slight departure from the band's early hardcore punk/thrash metal roots, by incorporating a slower groove metal sound. The title track was released as a music video. The song is featured in the end credits of the 1993 film Warlock: The Armageddon and in the 2017 film It.

Track listing
All songs written and composed by Nuclear Assault

Credits
Nuclear Assault
John Connelly – vocals, guitar
Dave DiPietro – guitar, backing vocals
Scott Metaxas – bass, backing vocals
Glenn Evans – drums

Guest musicians
Steve Hunter – special performance on "Behind Glass Walls"
Karl Cochran – 12-string guitar on "No Time"
Ray Gillen, Allan Anderson, Michael Sterlacci – gang vocals

Production
Scott Gordon – engineer
George Marino – mastering at Sterling Sound, New York

References

Nuclear Assault albums
1993 albums
I.R.S. Records albums